Innes is a lunar impact crater on the Moon's far side. It is located less than a crater diameter to the east-southeast of the prominent crater Seyfert. To the southeast of Innes is the crater Meggers, and to the west-southwest lies Polzunov.

This crater has not been significantly worn due to impact erosion, and the features remain well-defined. The shape is roughly circular with a slight outward bulge along the western edge. The inner walls have slumped somewhat, and some slight terracing has occurred. The interior floor is relatively featureless, and is marked only by a few tiny craterlets.

Satellite craters 

By convention these features are identified on lunar maps by placing the letter on the side of the crater midpoint that is closest to Innes.

See also 
 1658 Innes, minor planet

References 

 
 
 
 
 
 
 
 
 
 
 
 

Impact craters on the Moon